The Kidepo River is a seasonal river along the Kidepo Valley in the Karamoja region of Uganda, and in East Equatoria area of South Sudan.

See also
Seasonal rivers of Uganda include Agago river,Lumansi river, and Kidepo river
 List of rivers of Uganda
 List of rivers of South Sudan

Rivers of Uganda
Rivers of South Sudan
International rivers of Africa